Keamogetse Sadie Kenosi (born 17 January 1997) is a Botswana boxer. She competed in the women's featherweight event at the 2020 Summer Olympics. She lost to Karriss Artingstall of Great Britain in the first round. Originally a netball player, Kenosi began boxing in 2015. She competed at the 2019 World  Championships and won a gold medal at the 2019 African Games.

References

External link
 

1997 births
Living people
Botswana women boxers
Olympic boxers of Botswana
Boxers at the 2020 Summer Olympics
People from Francistown
Commonwealth Games competitors for Botswana
Boxers at the 2018 Commonwealth Games
African Games gold medalists for Botswana
African Games medalists in boxing
Competitors at the 2019 African Games